Béatrice Dussan, called Béatrix Dussane, (9 March 1888 - 3 March 1969) was a French stage actress. Admitted at the Comédie-Française in 1903, she became the 363th sociétaire in 1922. A street in the 15th arrondissement of Paris is named after her.

Biography 

Née Dussan, she added an "e" to her last name to mimic the great actress of the time Rejane (pseudonym of Gabrielle Réju). A first prize of classic comedy crowned her efforts 22 July 1903. She was immediately engaged as a boarder by Jules Claretie, the then director of the Comédie-Française. On 23 September, she made her debut in The Imaginary Invalid (role of Toinette). Named an associate in 1922, she sat on the board from 1935 to 1942.

A teacher at the Conservatoire d'Art dramatique de Paris, Sophie Desmarets, Robert Hirsch, Michel Bouquet, Maria Casarès, Serge Reggiani, Daniel Gélin, Gérard Oury, Michel Le Royer, Alice Sapritch, Gilles Claude Thierrault and many others were her students.

In the 1920s, she lectured, collaborated in different magazines (including La Revue française, La Revue universelle, Le Journal de la femme, La Revue hebdomadaire, Le Journal, etc.) and published several books on theatre. From 1951, she had a column in Le Mercure de France.

Towards the end of her career, she produced radio and television programs devoted to the history of theater: Au jour et aux lumières, Des chandelles aux projecteurs, Tréteaux, racontez moi, etc.

She was very a close friend of the poet Tristan Derème until his death in 1941. Dussane was married to Lucien Coulond, a playwright and journalist at Gil Blas, Comœdia and LeJournal.

She is buried at Père Lachaise cemetery (95th division).

Theatre

Comédie-Française 

 Admission at the Comédie-Française in 1903
 Sociétaire from 1922 to 1941
 363th sociétaire
 Honorary sociétaire in 1942

 1903: Les Précieuses ridicules by Molière as Toinette
 1905: Don Quixote by Jean Richepin after Miguel de Cervantes
 1906: La Courtisane by André Arnyvelde
 1906: Les Mouettes by Paul Adam
 1907: L'Étincelle by Édouard Pailleron 
 1907: L'amour veille by Robert de Flers and Gaston Arman de Caillavet
 1908: Le Bon Roi Dagobert by André Rivoire 
 1909: La Robe rouge by Eugène Brieux
 1912: Sapho by Alphonse Daudet and Adolphe Belot
 1912: Poil de carotte by Jules Renard
 1914: Le Prince charmant by Tristan Bernard
 1920: Romeo and Juliet by William Shakespeare 
 1921: The School for Husbands by Molière
 1921: La Coupe enchantée by Jean de La Fontaine and Champmeslé
 1921: Monsieur de Pourceaugnac by Molière
 1922: La Comtesse d'Escarbagnas by Molière
 1922: Vautrin by Edmond Guiraud after Honoré de Balzac
 1923: Jean de La Fontaine ou Le Distrait volontaire by Louis Geandreau and Léon Guillot de Saix
 1924: Je suis trop grand pour moi by Jean Sarment
 1928: Le Quatrième by Martial Piéchaud
 1933: Monsieur Vernet by Jules Renard, directed by Charles Granval
 1935: Madame Quinze by Jean Sarment, directed by the author
 1936: Le Voyage à Biarritz by Jean Sarment, directed by the author 
 1937: Business is business by Octave Mirbeau, directed by Fernand Ledoux

Hors Comédie-Française 
 1947 : Richard II by William Shakespeare, directed by Jean Vilar, 1st festival d'Avignon 
 1947 : L'Histoire de Tobie et de Sara by Paul Claudel, directed by Maurice Cazeneuve, 1st festival d'Avignon
 1951 : Jedermann by Hugo von Hofmannsthal, directed by Charles Gantillon, parvise of the Saint-Jean cathedral of Lyon

Cinema 
 1968 : Le Franciscain de Bourges by Claude Autant-Lara : The elegant lady

Bibliography 
La Comédie-Française, Paris, La Renaissance du livre, 1921 (rééd. Hachette, 1960)
Le Comédien sans paradoxe, Paris, Plon, 1933
Un comédien nommé Molière, Paris, Plon, 1936 (rééd. Plon, 1956)
Sophie Arnould, la plus spirituelle des bacchantes, Paris, Albin Michel, 1938
Mes quatre Comédies-Françaises, de Claretie à Bourdet, Paris, Le Divan, 1939
Du nouveau sur Racine, Paris, Le Divan, 1941
Les Vers que je dis, pourquoi ne les diriez-vous pas ?, Paris, Le Divan, 1943
Reines de théâtre (1633-1941), Lyon, H. Lardanchet, 1944
Notes de théâtre (1940-1950), Lyon, H. Lardanchet, 1951
Maria Casarès, Paris, Calmann-Lévy, 1953
Au jour et aux lumières. 1 - Premiers pas dans le temple, Paris, Calmann-Lévy, 1955
Au jour et aux lumières. 2 - Par les fenêtres, Paris, Calmann-Lévy, 1958
Le Théâtre, Paris, Hachette, 1958
Cas de conscience du comédien, Paris, Fleurus, 1960
J'étais dans la salle, Paris, Mercure de France, 1963 - Recueil de chroniques publiées entre 1951 et 1962
Dieux des planches, Paris, Flammarion, 1964

Further reading 
Nadine Audoubert, Dussane ou la Servante de Molière, Paris, France-Empire, 1977

References

External links 

 Fonds Béatrix Dussane dans le Répertoire des arts du spectacle (BNF)
 Interview de Beatrix Dussane (08/01/1961) sur le site de l'INA
 DUSSANE Béatrix (1888-1969)

20th-century French actresses
Sociétaires of the Comédie-Française
Actresses from Paris
1888 births
1969 deaths
Burials at Père Lachaise Cemetery